Alan D. Bersin (born October 15, 1946) served as the Commissioner of U.S. Customs and Border Protection (CBP). Commissioner Bersin was appointed by President Barack Obama on March 27, 2010 as a recess appointment. As Commissioner, Mr. Bersin oversaw the operations of CBP’s 57,000-employee work force and managed an operating budget of more than $11 billion. Bersin formerly served as the Department of Homeland Security Assistant Secretary for International Affairs and Special Representative for Border Affairs, informally known as the "Border Czar." Bersin later served as Assistant Secretary of International Affairs and Chief Diplomatic Officer for the Department of Homeland Security, a position he assumed on January 3, 2012 and held until January 2017.

Bersin is a former Secretary of Education for California, as well as a former superintendent of San Diego City Schools, past federal Assistant United States Attorney (AUSA) and United States Attorney for the United States District Court for the Southern District of California, and former Attorney General’s Southwest Border Representative. He previously served as the chair of the executive committee of the San Diego County Regional Airport Authority.

Background
Bersin was born in 1946 to a Jewish family in Brooklyn, New York. He attended public schools and Hebrew school in New York City. He received an A.B. in government from Harvard College, and then attended Balliol College, Oxford as a Rhodes Scholar. In 1974, he obtained a J.D. degree from Yale Law School.

From 1995 to 1998, Bersin served as the Attorney General’s Southwest Border Representative, coordinating law enforcement on the border between the U.S. and Mexico.

His appointment in 1998 as Superintendent of Public Education in San Diego City Schools put him in control of the eighth largest urban school district in the U.S. In 2005, California Governor Arnold Schwarzenegger appointed him as California's Education Secretary.

In 2007, the nonprofit electronic journalism outlet voiceofsandiego.org  reported that Bersin was considering a run for City Attorney of San Diego.

On April 15, 2009, Homeland Security Secretary Janet Napolitano announced the appointment of Bersin as DHS Assistant Secretary for International Affairs and Special Representative for Border Affairs. In the press release announcing his appointment, Secretary Napolitano said, "Alan brings years of vital experience working with local, state and international partners to help us meet the challenges we face at our borders. He will lead the effort to make our borders safe while working to promote commerce and trade."

Bersin's recess appointment in 2010 was effective only until the end of the next session of Congress.  Through the rest of 2010 and 2011, Republicans in the Senate refused to hold a confirmation hearing on the nomination, so in December 2011 he was forced to step down.

After leaving government service, Bersin became an advisor at the international law firm Covington and Burling.

See also
 List of U.S. executive branch czars

References

External links

 Biography at U.S. Department of Homeland Security

1946 births
Alumni of Balliol College, Oxford
20th-century American Jews
American Rhodes Scholars
California lawyers
Harvard College alumni
Living people
People associated with Munger, Tolles & Olson
People from Brooklyn
Recess appointments
State cabinet secretaries of California
United States Department of Homeland Security officials
Yale Law School alumni
21st-century American Jews